The seventh season of the American television comedy series How I Met Your Mother was announced in March 2011, along with confirmation of an eighth season. The seventh season premiered on CBS on September 19, 2011, with two episodes airing back to back, and concluded on May 14, 2012.

Cast

Main cast
 Josh Radnor as Ted Mosby
 Jason Segel as Marshall Eriksen
 Cobie Smulders as Robin Scherbatsky
 Neil Patrick Harris as Barney Stinson
 Alyson Hannigan as Lily Aldrin
 Bob Saget (uncredited) as future Ted Mosby (voice only)

Recurring cast
 Kal Penn as Kevin
 Lyndsy Fonseca as Penny, Ted's Daughter
 David Henrie as Luke, Ted's Son
 Becki Newton as Quinn Garvey
 Nazanin Boniadi as Nora
 Chris Elliott as Mickey Aldrin, Lily's father
 Ellen D. Williams as Patrice
 Ashley Williams as Victoria
 Alexis Denisof as Sandy Rivers 
 Vicki Lewis as Dr. Sonya
 Martin Short as Garrison Cootes, Marshall's boss
 Frances Conroy as Loretta Stinson
 Wayne Brady as James Stinson
 Bill Fagerbakke as Marvin Eriksen Sr.
 Ray Wise as Robin Scherbatsky Sr., Robin's father
 Suzie Plakson as Judy Eriksen
 Cristine Rose as Virginia Mosby
 Joe Nieves as Carl
 Chris Romano as Punchy
 Marshall Manesh as Ranjit

Guest cast
 Jimmi Simpson as Pete Durkenson
 Jeff Probst as himself
 "Weird Al" Yankovic as himself
 Katie Holmes as Naomi/Slutty Pumpkin
 Christina Pickles as Lily's grandmother
 Teresa Castillo as Maya
 Jerry Minor as King Charles
 Ernie Hudson as himself
 Will Sasso as Doug Martin
 Lindsey Morgan as Lauren
 Rachel Bloom as Wanda
 Conan O'Brien as a background bar patron (uncredited)
 Francesca Capaldi as Young Lily
 Rob Huebel as Mr. Flanagan

Ratings
, the 7th season was averaging a 5.3 rating / 14% share among adults 18–49, ranking as the 5th highest rated comedy series among adults 18–49.

On April 8, 2012, the New York Times stated that the 7th season ratings had reached a series high, marking a 20% increase in ratings among adults 18–49.

Reception
Season seven of How I Met Your Mother received mixed reviews from critics. Alan Sepinwall gave the season a mixed review and criticized the flash-forwards throughout the season saying, "the show is just much, much stronger when its stories dwell on matters of the present or the past, and where the writers don't have to act like magicians trying to keep the audience from figuring out how the trick works. And the finale affirmed that belief for me. The parts that had little or nothing to do with things to come were quite good; the parts that were all about the future made me roll my eyes and ask, for the umpteenth time: 'Really? This is where you're going with this?'". Ethan Alter, of Television Without Pity, gave the season a lukewarm response. In his review of the season finale, he criticized the Robin-Barney storyline throughout the season, writing "So after an entire season, we're basically right back where we started, with the writers having taken 24 episodes to stage a reveal that could have happened in the first five minutes of the premiere and had the exact same impact."

Episodes

DVD release

References

General references

External links
 

7
2011 American television seasons
2012 American television seasons